SAP Cloud Platform has been rebranded as SAP Business Technology Platform (BTP).

SAP Cloud Platform (SCP) was a platform as a service developed by SAP SE for creating new applications or extending existing applications in a secure cloud computing environment managed by SAP. The SAP Cloud Platform integrated data and business processes.

Overview 
SAP Cloud Platform was an open platform-as-a-service, which included the in-memory SAP HANA database management system, connects to both on premises and cloud-based systems running SAP or other third-party software and relies on open standards, like Java, JavaScript, Node.js and Cloud Foundry for integration options.

SAP and Apple Inc. partnered to develop mobile applications on iOS using cloud-based software development kits (SDKs) for the SAP Cloud Platform.

SAP Cloud Platform was based on open source technology, developed & supported in partnership with SUSE.

The company worked with the Cloud Foundry Foundation for an offering of SAP Cloud Platform that enabled customers to test out and give feedback for the functionalities coming with Cloud Foundry.

History
Initially unveiled as SAP NetWeaver Cloud belonging to the SAP HANA Cloud portfolio on October 16, 2012 the cloud platform was reintroduced with the new name SAP HANA Cloud Platform on May 13, 2013 as the foundation for SAP cloud products, including the SAP BusinessObjects Cloud. Adoption of the SAP HANA Cloud Platform has increased steadily since the platform's launch in 2012, with SAP claiming over 4000 customers and 500 partners adopting the SAP HANA Cloud Platform.

On February 27, 2017, SAP HANA Cloud Platform was renamed SAP Cloud Platform at the Mobile World Congress.

On January 18, 2021, SAP Cloud Platform was officially removed from SAP's product portfolio to support SAP Business Technology Platform (SAP BTP).

Capabilities 
SAP Cloud Platform contained many cloud services. For a better overview, they were assigned to several categories. The following list contains all the categories defined by SAP:

Benefits 
Some applications were available from the SAP HANA App Center (now merged with the SAP Store), to extend and integrate applications, customize existing applications, and extend their mobile footprint with mobile-first apps. With SAP Cloud Platform developers could build applications which run in the cloud, but still access data from the premises or other clouds.

SAP Cloud Platform, developer edition offered users a way to explore SAP Cloud Platform and its capabilities. In addition to 1GB shared SAP HANA, SAP Cloud Platform provides users to:
 Create column views using both HANA Studio and SQL commands via JDBC
 Connect to the HANA instance on SAP Cloud Platform easily via Eclipse
 Deploy the apps on Cloud Foundry based runtimes and backing services
 Connect to up to 2 on-premises systems
 Create unlimited HTML apps
 Test drive the Java applications

See also 
 SAP Business Technology Platform (BTP)
 Amazon Web Services
 Google Cloud Platform
 IBM Cloud
 Microsoft Azure
 Oracle Cloud

References

External links 
  

SAP SE
2012 software
Cloud computing providers
Cloud computing
Cloud infrastructure
Cloud platforms
Cloud storage
Computer-related introductions in 2010
Web hosting